Cill Míde is the Irish-language name for two villages in Ireland:

 Kilmead, County Kildare
 Kilmeedy, County Limerick